Bu Xin (Chinese: 卜鑫; born 17 May 1987) is a Chinese football player who currently plays for China League One side Heilongjiang Ice City.

Club career
In 2006, Bu Xin started his professional footballer career with Liaoning Whowin in the Chinese Super League. In 2007, he moved to S. League side Liaoning Guangyuan on a one-year loan deal. He would eventually make his league debut for Liaoning on 10 May 2008 in a game against Beijing Guoan, coming on as a substitute for Yu Hanchao in the 60th minute in a 2-0 defeat. In 2010, he moved to China League Two side Liaoning Tiger on another one-year loan deal. 

In 2011, he was loaned to China League Two side Harbin Yiteng until 31 December. In the 2011 China League Two campaign he would be part of the team that won the division and promotion into the second tier. After his successful loan with the club on March 2012, Bu transferred to China League One side Harbin Yiteng. He would go on to be a member of the squad as they moved up divisions and gained promotion to the Chinese Super League.

On 20 December 2015, Bu transferred to fellow China League One side Beijing Enterprises Group. On 13 February 2019, Bu transferred to China League One club Guangdong South China Tiger.

Career statistics 
Statistics accurate as of match played 31 December 2020.

Honours

Club
Harbin Yiteng
 China League Two: 2011

References

External links
 

1987 births
Living people
Chinese footballers
Footballers from Hubei
Singapore Premier League players
Liaoning F.C. players
Zhejiang Yiteng F.C. players
Beijing Sport University F.C. players
Guangdong South China Tiger F.C. players
Chinese Super League players
China League One players
China League Two players
Association football midfielders
Sportspeople from Tangshan